Natsuko Dam is a gravity dam located in Tokushima prefecture in Japan. The dam is used for irrigation. The catchment area of the dam is 26.7 km2. The dam impounds about 14  ha of land when full and can store 1600 thousand cubic meters of water. The construction of the dam was started on 1979 and completed in 1994.

References

Dams in Tokushima Prefecture
1994 establishments in Japan